Andy Armstrong is an English cricketer who played for Hertfordshire. He was a left-handed batsman and wicket-keeper.

Armstrong made a single List A appearance for the team, in August 2002, against Bedfordshire. From the lower order, he scored 3 runs and took 2 catches.

External links
Andy Armstrong at Cricket Archive 

Living people
English cricketers
Hertfordshire cricketers
Year of birth missing (living people)